Fentonia is a genus of moths of the family Notodontidae erected by Arthur Gardiner Butler in 1881.

Species
Fentonia baibarana Matsumura, 1929
Fentonia bipunctus (Rothschild, 1917)
Fentonia excurvata (Hampson, [1893])
Fentonia helena Kiriakoff, 1974
Fentonia macroparabolica Nakamura, 1973
Fentonia notodontina (Rothschild, 1917)
Fentonia ocypete (Bremer, 1861)
Fentonia parabolica (Matsumura, 1925)
Fentonia shenghua Schintlmeister & Fang, 2001
Fentonia sumatrana Kiriakoff, 1974
Fentonia talboti (Gaede, 1930)

References

Notodontidae
Moth genera